The Gold Dust Orphans are a fringe theater company based in Boston and Provincetown, Massachusetts.  It was founded in 1995 by writer/performer Ryan Landry, Scott Martino, Afrodite (aka Andre Shoals), and Billy Hough.  It is a group of actors, musicians, writers and visual artists dedicated to the production of shows that are often based on works of film, theater, and popular culture.  Many of the roles are played in the classical tradition by men in drag.

Production history 

1993

Psycho Beach Party, Camille 

1998
How Mrs. Grinchly Swiped Christmas
1999
Charlie's Angels & the Case of the Tobacco Heiress, Medea
2000
 The Bunny Trail, Joan of Arkansas
2001
Madame Ex
2002
Rosemary's Baby - The Musical!, Camille, Scarrie, Joan Crawford's Christmas On the Pole
2003
The Bad Seed, The Gulls, Who's Afraid of the Virgin Mary?
2004
Pussy On The House, The Septic Wives, The Exorcissy, Who's Afraid of the Virgin Mary? (revival)
2005
A T Stop Named Denial, The Golden Squirells, Cinderella Rocks!
2006
Death Of A Saleslady, Cleopatra the Musical, The Twilight Zone, Silent Night Of The Lambs
2007
The Plexiglass Menagerie, The Milkman Always Comes Twice, Silent Night Of The Lambs (revival)
2008
Medea, Whizzin'!, All About Christmas Eve
2009
Of Mice and Mink, Willie Wanker and the Hershey Highway, Valet Of The Dolls, All About Christmas Eve (revival)
2010
Phantom of the Oprah, The Gulls (revival), Mrs. Grinchly's Christmas Carol
2011
Pussy on the House (revival), Peter Pansy, The Rocky Horror Show, Mrs. Grinchly's Christmas Carol (revival)
2012
The Little Pricks, Mary Poppers, Rudolph the Red Necked Reindeer
2013
Mildred Fierce, Pornocchio
2014
It's a Horrible Life, Snow White and the Seven Bottoms, Jesus Christ, It's Christmas!
2015
Thoroughly Muslim Millie, Little Orphan Tranny
2016
Legally Blind - The Helen Keller Musical, Murder on the Polar Express
2017
Greece - A Highschool Musical, Whatever Happened to Baby Jesus?
2018
Brokelahomo, Nightmare on Elf Street
2019
The Ebonic Woman, Christmas on Uranus

Awards and nominations 
2007
Elliot Norton Awards
 Nominated for Outstanding Production by a Fringe Company - Silent Night of The Lambs
2008
Elliot Norton Awards
Nominated for Best Choreography - All About Christmas Eve
2010
Elliot Norton Awards
Won for Best Director, Small or Fringe Company- Larry Coen for Phantom of the Oprah
Won for Outstanding Musical Performance- Jeffery Roberson aka Varla Jean Merman in Phantom of the Oprah
Nominated for Outstanding Musical Production - Phantom of the Oprah
Nominated for Outstanding Design, Midsize, Small, or Fringe Company -Phantom of the Oprah
2011
Elliot Norton Awards
Nominated for Outstanding New Script - Ryan Landry for Mrs. Grinchley's Christmas Carol
Won for Outstanding Production (Fringe Theater) - Mrs. Grinchley's Christmas Carol
2012
Elliot Norton Awards
Nominated for Outstanding Design (Fringe, Small, Medium Theater) - The Rocky Horror Show
Nominated for Outstanding Performance by an Actor - Scott Martino for The Little Pricks
Nominated for Outstanding Musical Performance by an Actor - Gene Dante for The Rocky Horror Show 
Nominated for Outstanding Musical Production (Small/Midsize Theater) - Peter Pansy
2013
Elliot Norton Awards
Nominated for Outstanding Design, Midsize, Small or Fringe Theater - Mildred Fierce 
Nominated for Outstanding Musical Production by a Midsize, Small or Fringe Company - Mildred Fierce
Nominated for Outstanding Director, Small or Fringe Theater - James P. Byrne for Mildred Fierce
Won for Outstanding New Script - Ryan Landry for Mildred Fierce 
2014

Nominated for Outstanding Musical Production by a Mid-Size/Small Company - It's a Horrible Life
Nominated for Outstanding Musical Performance by an Actor - Paul Melendy as George Bailey - It's a Horrible Life
2016

Won Outstanding Musical Performance by an Actor - Tim Lawton as Mary Cheney - Thoroughly Muslim Millie
Nominated for Best Musical - Thoroughly Muslim Millie

External links
 Official Website
 Facebook page
 @GoldDustOrphans Official Twitter
 Boston Globe
 Bay Windows
 Weekly Dig
 Edge
 Boston Globe
 Boston Globe

Theatre companies in Boston
American satirists
LGBT theatre in the United States